Roda may refer to the following people
Given name
Roda Antar (born 1980), Sierra Leone-born Lebanese professional footballer
Roda Ali Wais (born 1984), Djiboutian middle-distance runner

Surname
Alexander Roda Roda (1872–1945), Austrian writer
Andrea Roda (born 1990), Italian Formula 3 and Formula Renault 3.5 car racing driver
Andy Roda, Danish-Filipino singer, songwriter, arranger, producer, instrumentalist, visual artist and occasional actor
Davide Roda (born 1972), Italian auto racing driver
Federico Martínez Roda (born 1950), Spanish professor of history at the Valencia Catholic University
Manuel de Roda (1706–1782), Spanish statesman
Maria Roda (1877–1958), Italian American anarchist-feminist activist, speaker and writer
Raymond of Roda (died 1095), Spanish bishop of Roda from 1076 until his death
Stéphane Roda (born 1973), French footballer

Feminine given names